Hack Flats is a flat located in the Catskill Mountains of New York south-southwest of Grand Gorge. White Man Mountain is located west, Roundtop is located east-northeast, and Red Mountain is located southwest of Hack Flats.

References

Mountains of Delaware County, New York
Mountains of New York (state)